Pygopleurus hirsutus is a species of beetle from the Glaphyridae family. The scientific name of this species was first published in 1832 by Brullé.

References

Beetles described in 1832
Glaphyridae
Taxa named by Gaspard Auguste Brullé